Frank Cullen Albert (January 27, 1920 – September 4, 2002) was an American gridiron football player and coach. He played as a quarterback with the San Francisco 49ers in the National Football League (NFL). Albert attended Stanford University, where he led the 1940 football team to an undefeated season and the Rose Bowl.

Many who saw Albert in action credit him as being the greatest left-handed quarterback ever to play the game.

Early life
Albert was born in Chicago and attended Glendale High School in Glendale, California. He went to Stanford University, where he was coached by T formation innovator Clark Shaughnessy. Albert played as Stanford's quarterback and in 1940–41 became an all-American. He was the first college T-formation quarterback in modern football history. He led the team of 1940 to a 9–0 regular season, 21–13 victory over Nebraska in the Rose Bowl and a No. 2 national ranking, behind Minnesota.  He was also a member of Stanford's chapter of the Delta Kappa Epsilon fraternity.

Professional football career
After graduation Albert served in the Navy during World War II for four years. In the 1942 NFL Draft the Chicago Bears selected Albert with the 10th overall pick. After quarterbacking the Los Angeles Bulldogs of the Pacific Coast Football League in 1945, he launched his All-Pro career with the San Francisco 49ers of the All-America Football Conference in 1946. He played seven seasons with the 49ers. In 1948, he had the record for most passing touchdowns in a season in the league's history, and was named AAFC co-Most Valuable Player with Otto Graham. He played his last two seasons competing with Y. A. Tittle. In 1950, Albert was named to the Pro Bowl when the 49ers joined the National Football League. He retired after the season of 1952. In seven pro seasons, Albert threw for 10,795 yards and 115 touchdowns.

Albert played one final season with the Canadian Football League's Calgary Stampeders.

Coaching career
After his retirement, the San Francisco 49ers hired him as a scout and coach. He was named head coach in 1956 by owner Tony Morabito. 

In his second year, Albert led the 49ers to their first winning record since 1954. They won five of their six games before a three-game losing streak had them at 5-4. They won the final three games to finish 8-4. They finished in a tie for first in the Western Conference with the Detroit Lions, with both teams winning against the other at home. As such, they had to play a one-game playoff to determine who would play in the NFL Championship Game, with this being their first playoff game since 1949. On December 22, they played the Lions at Kezar Stadium. Facing backup Tobin Rote (subbing in for Bobby Layne, hurt two weeks earlier), the 49ers led 24–7 at halftime on the strength of three touchdown passes from Y. A. Tittle. They led by twenty after a field goal in the third quarter, but Detroit roared back in a monumental comeback, scoring 24 unanswered points to win 31-27.

Albert led the team to a 6-6 record the following year before he was replaced by Red Hickey; the 49ers would not threaten for a playoff spot until 1970. He coached the 49ers for three seasons, compiling a 19–16–1 record.

The Professional Football Researchers Association named Albert to the PFRA Hall of Very Good Class of 2007

Head coaching record

NFL

Later life
After football, Albert got into real estate as he helped raise three daughters with his high school sweetheart and wife of 60 years, Martha. All three of his daughters attended Stanford. One of his daughters, Jane Albert Willens, ’67, was an All-American tennis player.

He died on September 4, 2002, from Alzheimer's disease. In addition to his wife, Martha, Albert was survived by his three daughters: Nancy James of Bend, Oregon; Jane Willens of Palo Alto; and Terry Levin of San Francisco; and as well as seven grandchildren.

References

External links
 
 
 

1920 births
2002 deaths
American football quarterbacks
College football announcers
Saint Mary's Pre-Flight Air Devils football players
San Francisco 49ers (AAFC) players
San Francisco 49ers head coaches
San Francisco 49ers coaches
San Francisco 49ers players
Stanford Cardinal football players
National Football League announcers
All-American college football players
College Football Hall of Fame inductees
Western Conference Pro Bowl players
United States Navy personnel of World War II
Players of American football from Chicago
Sportspeople from Glendale, California
Coaches of American football from California
Players of American football from California
Deaths from Alzheimer's disease
Deaths from dementia in California
Glendale High School (Glendale, California) alumni